Mathias Pereira Lage (born 30 November 1996) is a professional footballer who plays as a midfielder for Ligue 1 club Brest. Born in France, he is a former Portugal youth international.

Club career
On 12 February 2016, Pereira Lage made his senior debut, appearing with Clermont in a Ligue 2 match against Ajaccio after coming on as a substitute in the 55th minute. In just his second appearance on 1 April for the same competition, he scored his first professional goal, in the dying minutes of a 3–0 away win over Créteil. In June 2022, he joined Breton club Brest.

International career
Born in France, Pereira Lage is of Portuguese descent. He played for the Portugal U21s in 2018.

References

External links
 
 

1996 births
Living people
French people of Portuguese descent
Sportspeople from Clermont-Ferrand
Portuguese footballers
Footballers from Auvergne-Rhône-Alpes
French footballers
Association football midfielders
Portugal youth international footballers
Ligue 1 players
Ligue 2 players
Championnat National 3 players
Clermont Foot players
Angers SCO players
Stade Brestois 29 players